Ivanica (Serbian Cyrillic: Иваница) is a small village in Bosnia and Herzegovina which is located just over the border from Gornji Brgat in Croatia. It has an unobstructed view of the Adriatic sea. Due to its close location to Dubrovnik Ivanica gravitates to Dubrovnik and many of its inhabitants work or live in Dubrovnik. Recently, the settlement has been experiencing rapid development and expansion due to construction of many new apartment projects.

Geography 
The village of Ivanica is located on a hill near Dubrovnik overlooking the Adriatic sea. It is located in the region of Herzegovina, 8 km north-east from Dubrovnik and 20 km south-west from Trebinje. It is a part of Ravno municipality which is located in the Federation of Bosnia and Herzegovina.

History
Before the Bosnian War (1992–1995) Ivanica was a part of Trebinje municipality, after the war the municipality was split and Ivanica became a part of the Ravno municipality. The village was damaged during the Bosnian War but later reconstructed in the 2000s.

Demographics

Population

Ethnic composition

References

Populated places in Ravno, Bosnia and Herzegovina
Populated places in Bosnia and Herzegovina
Tourism in Bosnia and Herzegovina